is a Japanese economist and has been the C.V. Starr Professor of Economics at New York University since 1985. He made notable contributions to the fields of mathematical economics and economic growth.

Selected publications

References 

1931 births
Living people
Japanese economists
People from Yuzawa, Akita
Johns Hopkins University alumni
Hitotsubashi University alumni
New York University faculty